Emmelina is a genus of moths in the family Pterophoridae with a nearly cosmopolitan distribution.

Ecology
Also called "insetto egizio" the species seem to be polyphagous, but representatives of the genera Convolvulus and Calystegia are preferred.

Species
Emmelina aethes 
Emmelina amseli (Bigot, 1967)
Emmelina argoteles (Meyrick, 1922)
Emmelina bigoti Gibeaux, 1990
Emmelina buscki (Barnes & Lindsey, 1921)
Emmelina jason 
Emmelina lochmaius (Bigot, 1974)
Emmelina monodactyla (Linnaeus, 1758)
Emmelina suspiciosus 

Oidaematophorini
Taxa named by J. W. Tutt